Montague (minor planet designation: 535 Montague) is a minor planet orbiting the Sun that was discovered by Raymond Smith Dugan on 7 May 1904 in Heidelberg, Germany. It was named after the town Montague in Massachusetts.

Photometric observations of this asteroid give a light curve with a period of 10.248 hours.

References

External links 
 Lightcurve plot of 535 Montague, Palmer Divide Observatory, B. D. Warner (2006)
 Lightcurve plot of (535) Montague, Antelope Hills Observatory
 Asteroid Lightcurve Database (LCDB), query form (info )
 Dictionary of Minor Planet Names, Google books
 Asteroids and comets rotation curves, CdR – Observatoire de Genève, Raoul Behrend
 Discovery Circumstances: Numbered Minor Planets (1)-(5000) – Minor Planet Center
 
 

Background asteroids
Montague
Montague
C-type asteroids (Tholen)
19040507